Tony Forsberg (born 13 August 1933) is a Swedish cinematographer. At the 28th Guldbagge Awards he won the award for Best Cinematography for the film Sunday's Children. He has worked on more than 60 films and television shows between 1955 and 2002.

Selected filmography
 Lovely Is the Summer Night (1961)
 Ticket to Paradise (1962)
 A Sunday in September (1963)
 What the Swedish Butler Saw (1975)
 Paradise Place (1977)
 The Adventures of Picasso (1978)
 Sally and Freedom (1981)
 When the Raven Flies (1984)
 In the Shadow of the Raven (1988)
 Sunday's Children (1992)
 Murder at the Savoy (1993)
 In the Presence of a Clown (1997)

References

External links

1933 births
Living people
Swedish cinematographers
Place of birth missing (living people)
Best Cinematographer Guldbagge Award winners